Diana Foșha is a Romanian-American psychologist, known for developing accelerated experiential dynamic psychotherapy (AEDP), and for her work on the psychotherapy of adults suffering the effects of childhood attachment trauma and abuse.

Education and career 
Fosha was born in Bucharest, but her family emigrated to the United States when she was 12 years old, settling in New York. She studied psychology at Barnard College and then went on to complete a doctorate in clinical psychology at the City College of New York. She also undertook post-doctoral training with Habib Davanloo, the developer of a form of psychodynamic psychotherapy called intensive short-term dynamic psychotherapy.

In her early career Fosha held teaching positions at the City University of New York and Adelphi University. She was also an adjunct professor of psychiatry at Bellevue Hospital, and was on the faculty of New York University and the St. Luke's–Roosevelt Hospital Center.

Accelerated experiential dynamic psychotherapy 
Fosha developed a theory and technique of psychotherapy, AEDP, based upon several conceptual premises as points of departure from the prevailing psychodynamic psychotherapies. Her theory of how healing occurs in psychotherapy derives from her interpretation of research findings in several areas: the neuroscience of attachment, caregiver–infant interaction research, positive psychology, emotion research, psychotherapy research findings on therapist qualities associated with positive therapy outcomes, and phenomenology of the psychological experience of sudden change. The AEDP Institute is actively engaged in ongoing research evaluating the effectiveness of AEDP.

Her core premise is that the desire to heal and grow is a wired-in capacity, which she calls the transformance drive. Emotional healing and brain re-wiring  the patient, with the help of the therapist, is able to experience, in a regulated manner, emotions that had been blocked due to traumatic overwhelm. Healing is accelerated through a tracking of emerging affect, so the patient can have a complete emotional experience, and then reflect upon the experience of healing change itself, with the help of the therapist. Fosha terms this technique meta-therapeutic processing. This repeated and prolonged amplification of the experience of change has been called one of AEDP's "unique" contributions to the psychotherapy literature.

The AEDP Institute  was formed in New York City in 2004. The institute has satellite institutes throughout the US, and in Brazil, Canada, France, Italy, Sweden, Israel, China, and Japan.

Selected bibliography

Books 
 Fosha, D. (2000). The Transforming Power of Affect: A Model For Accelerated Change. Basic Books 
 Fosha, D, Siegel, D., Solomon M., Eds. (2009). The Healing Power of Emotion: Affective Neuroscience, Development & Clinical Practice. New York: W.W. Norton & Co.
 Prenn, N., Fosha, D. (2016). Supervision Essentials for Accelerated Experiential Dynamic Psychotherapy. Part of the Clinical Supervision Essentials Series. American Psychological Association, Washington, D.C.
 Fosha, D. (2021). Undoing Aloneness and the Transformation of Suffering Into Flourishing: AEDP 2.0. American Psychological Association, Washington, D.C.  AAP Prose Award Winner.

Book chapters 
 Fosha, D. (2000). Meta-therapeutic processes and the affects of transformation: Affirmation and the healing affects. Journal of Psychotherapy Integration. 10, 71–97.
 Fosha, D. (2002). The activation of affective change processes in AEDP. In J. J. Magnavita (Ed.). Comprehensive Handbook of Psychotherapy. Vol. 1: Psychodynamic and Object Relations Psychotherapies New York: John Wiley & Sons. 
 Fosha, D. (2003). Dyadic Regulation and Experiential Work with Emotion and Relatedness in Trauma and Disordered Attachment. In M. F. Solomon & D. J. Siegel (Eds.). Healing Trauma: Attachment, Mind, Body, and Brain. New York: Norton. 
 Fosha D. (2009). Emotion and recognition at work: Energy, vitality, pleasure, truth, desire & the emergent phenomenology of transformational experience. In D. Fosha, D. J. Siegel & M. F. Solomon (Eds.), The healing power of emotion: Affective Neuroscience, Development, Clinical Practice (pp. 172–203). New York: Norton.
 Fosha, D. (2009). Positive affects and the transformation of suffering into flourishing. W. C. Bushell, E. L. Olivo, & N. D. Theise (Eds.) Longevity, regeneration, and optimal health: Integrating Eastern and Western perspectives (pp. 252–261). New York: Annals of the New York Academy of Sciences.
 Fosha, D. (2009) Healing Attachment Trauma with Attachment (and then some!) In M. Kerman (Ed.) Clinical Pearls of Wisdom: 21 Leading Therapists Offer their Key Insights New York: Norton
 Fosha, D. (2013). Turbocharging the Affects of Healing and Redressing the Evolutionary Tilt. In D. J. Siegel & Marion F. Solomon (Eds). Healing Moments in Psychotherapy. Chapter 8 (pp. 129–168). New York: Norton. 
 Fosha, D. (2017). Something More than “Something More than Interpretation:” AEDP Works the Experiential Edge of Transformational Experience to Transform the Internal Working Model. In S. Lord (Ed). Moments of Meeting in Psychoanalysis: Interaction and Change in the Therapeutic Encounter. Chapter 15. New York: Routledge. (Go to Amazon page for the book).
 Fosha, D. (2017). How to be a Transformational Therapist: AEDP Harnesses Innate Healing Affects to Re-wire Experience and Accelerate Transformation. In J. Loizzo, M. Neale & E. Wolf, (Eds). Advances in Contemplative Psychotherapy: Accelerating Transformation. Chapter 14 (pp. 204–219). New York: Norton. (Go to Amazon page for the book)

Articles 
 Fosha, D. (2001). The dyadic regulation of affect. Journal of Clinical Psychology/In Session. 57 (2), 227–242.
 Fosha, D. (2001). Trauma reveals the roots of resilience. Special September 11 Issue. Constructivism in the Human Sciences. 6 (1 & 2), 7–15.
 Fosha, D. (2004). "Nothing that feels bad is ever the last step": The role of positive emotions in experiential work with difficult emotional experiences. Special issue on Emotion, L. Greenberg (Ed.). Clinical Psychology and Psychotherapy. 11, 30–43.
 Fosha, D. (2004). Brief integrative psychotherapy comes of age: reflections. Journal of Psychotherapy Integration. 14, 66-92
 Fosha, D. (2005). Emotion, true self, true other, core state: toward a clinical theory of affective change process. Psychoanalytic Review. 92 (4), 513–552.
 Fosha, D. (2006). Quantum transformation in trauma and treatment: Traversing the crisis of healing change. Journal of Clinical Psychology/In Session. 62 (5), 569–583.
 Fosha D. (2009). Emotion and recognition at work: energy, vitality, pleasure, truth, desire & the emergent phenomenology of transformational experience. In D. Fosha, D. J. Siegel & M. F. Solomon (Eds.), The healing power of emotion: Affective neuroscience, development, clinical practice (pp. 172–203). New York: Norton. Also reprinted in The Neuropsychotherapist. Jul/Sep 2013 (2), 28–51. www.theneuropsychotherapist.com
 Lipton, B., & Fosha, D. (2011). Attachment as a Transformative Process in AEDP: Operationalizing the Intersection of Attachment Theory and Affective Neuroscience. Journal of Psychotherapy Integration. 21 (3), 253–279.
 Fosha, D. (2013). A heaven in a wild flower: self, dissociation, and treatment in the context of the neurobiological core self. Psychoanalytic Inquiry, 33, 496–523. DOI: 10.108007351690.2013.815067
 Fosha, D. (2013). Speculations on emergence: working the edge of transformational experience and neuroplasticity. International Neuropsychotherapy Magazine, 2013, 1 (1), 120–121. Also in The Neuropsychotherapist, Issue I,  www.theneuropsychotherapist.com.
 Fosha, D. (2018). Introduction to commentaries on sociocultural identity, trauma treatment, and AEDP through the lens of bilingualism in the case of “Rosa.” Pragmatic Case Studies in Psychotherapy, Volume 14, Module 2, Article 2, pp. 115–130.  http://pcsp.libraries.rutgers.edu .
 Fosha, D., Thoma, N. & Yeung, D. (2019). Transforming emotional suffering into flourishing: Metatherapeutic processing of positive affect as a trans-theoretical vehicle for change. Counseling Psychology Quarterly

References 

Year of birth missing (living people)
Living people
American women psychologists
21st-century American psychologists
Barnard College alumni
City University of New York alumni
Adelphi University faculty
New York University faculty
City University of New York faculty
Romanian emigrants to the United States
American women academics
21st-century American women